The Tomb of Nizam al-Mulk (Aramgah-e Nezamolmolk) is in the Ahmadabad quarter of Isfahan. Nizam al-Mulk was the powerful vizier of some Seljuq sultans. Beside his gravestone there are two other gravestones which belong to Malik-Shah I and his wife Tarkan Khatun, who may have had a hand in Nizam's murder. Besides the many changes in the garden and structure of tomb, the three valuable gravestones have been changed also. The current simple gravestones date back to Safavid era. No names are mentioned on them (perhaps by intention) and there are some sentences from Quran on them. The gravestone, which is known as Nizam al-Mulk's gravestone is a marble gravestone and has a dimension of 2 m x 35 cm x 38 cm (length x width x height).

References 

Mausoleums in Isfahan
Tombs in Iran
Cemeteries in Iran